Vanaraja is a dual-purpose chicken variety developed by the ICAR-Directorate of Poultry Research (formerly Project Directorate on Poultry) in Hyderabad, India. Vanaraja is aimed a rural communities where it can be reared in backyard on natural, scavenged food with minimal supplementation. It produces eggs and meat based on rearing and feeding practices. Important features of this breed are  multi-color feather pattern, immunity to disease, perform with less nutrition, grow faster and produce more eggs, produce brown eggs like local hens.

Vanaraja give their best performance when reared free range. They each produce up to 110 eggs per year, and weigh  at age 6 to  months. Vaccination of native birds along with Vanaraja is recommended. Excess body weight may reduce egg production. Vanaraja are mainly found in Telangana and Andhra Pradesh and being supplied to 26 states of India from ICAR-DPR, Hyderabad.

External links
 Backyard Poultry Farming of Vanaraja Breed: A Less Capital Enterprise, Indian Council of Agricultural Research, Access: 25 February 2015.

References

Chicken breeds originating in India
Chicken breeds